Anyone Can Fly is the title of the fourth solo album by Denny Laine.

Track listing
All tracks composed by Denny Laine

Side one
 "Running Round In Circles" 4.03
 "Be Together" 5.07
 "Who Moved the World?" 3.59
 "Racing Cars" 4.19

Side two
 "Various Shapes and Forms" 4.39
 "I Always Thought" 4.09
 "Could Not Believe" 3.23
 "Anyone Can Fly" 5.08

Personnel
Denny Laine - Lead Vocals, Guitar, Banjo, Bass, Piano, Mandolin & Harmonica
John Hollywood - Drums
Chris Slade - Drums
Gordon Sellar - Bass & Guitar
Norman "Hurricane" Smith - Piano, Brass, Percussion and Backing Vocals

1982 albums
Denny Laine albums
Albums produced by Norman Smith (record producer)